Martin Caulfield is an Irish former Gaelic footballer who played for Na Rossa and the Donegal county team.

He made a substitute appearance in Mickey Moran's first game in charge, a league victory at home to Offaly.
He was a former Donegal player by 2008.

He later emigrated.

He also played for Donegal Boston.

References

Year of birth missing (living people)
Living people
Donegal Boston Gaelic footballers
Donegal inter-county Gaelic footballers
Irish expatriate sportspeople in the United States
Na Rossa Gaelic footballers